Diptyque  is a luxury French fragrance brand founded in 1961 at 34 Boulevard Saint-Germain in the 5th arrondissement of Paris. The company produces eau de parfum, eau de toilette, scented candles, and perfume oil diffusers. The original boutique still operates at the same location in Paris, and the brand has boutiques in London, Tokyo, New York City, Hong Kong, Basel, Doha, Dubai, Milan, Beverly Hills, Miami, Las Vegas, San Francisco, Seoul and Chicago.
The name comes from Ancient Greek (δίπτυχος) meaning a two-panel image.

History
In 2005, the company was bought by London-based private equity firm Manzanita Capital.

Fragrances

Figuier 
Baies
Philosykos
L'Ombre dans L'Eau
Do Son
L'Eau des Sens
Eau Rose
Tam Dao
Fleur de Peau

See also
Byredo
Le Labo
Francis Kurkdjian
List of perfumes

References

External links

Luxury brands
Perfume houses
French companies established in 1961
Cosmetics companies of France